WIKI (95.3 FM) is a country music–formatted radio station licensed to Carrollton, Kentucky, United States, and primarily serving Madison, Indiana. The station is currently owned by Wagon Wheel Broadcasting, LLC. WIKI maintains studios on Clifty Drive in northern Madison, while its transmitter is located along Culls Ridge Road in rural eastern Trimble County, Kentucky west of Carrollton.

History
WIKI went on-the-air in April of 1968 under the call letters WVCM (Welcome Voice of Country Music). The station was launched by a group of local investors under the leadership of Dwight Moreillon and Charlie Cutler. WVCM would gain a sister station in 1974 when two would sign-on another station in nearby Vevay, Indiana: WKID (95.9 FM). The two are no longer co-owned.

In 1979, WVCM was purchased by Robert Doan, who took the station off-air and worked on technical upgrades. The next year, the station re-launched as WIKI with an adult contemporary format. George Freeman would purchase the station in 1984, flipping the station back to country music. In 1993, WIKI changed frequencies to 95.3 MHz after its ownership got the allotment relocated from Falmouth, Kentucky.

References

External links
WIKI official Website

IKI
Carrollton, Kentucky
1968 establishments in Kentucky
Radio stations established in 1968